A season-by-season record of FC Bayern Munich II.

Key 

Key to league record:
P = Played
W = Games won
D = Games drawn
L = Games lost
F = Goals for
A = Goals against
Pts = Points
Pos = Final position
PO = Play-offs
Att = Average home attendance

Key to rounds:
R1 = Round 1
R2 = Round 2
R3 = Round 3
QF = Quarter-finals
SF = Semi-finals
RU = Runners-up
W = Winners

Seasons

Notes

See also
List of FC Bayern Munich seasons

Bayern Munich II
 
German football club statistics